"The Chimney Sweeper" is the title of a poem by William Blake, published in two parts in Songs of Innocence in 1789 and Songs of Experience in 1794. The poem "The Chimney Sweeper" is set against the dark background of child labour that was prominent in England in the late 18th and 19th centuries. At the age of four and five, boys were sold to clean chimneys, due to their small size. These children were oppressed and had a diminutive existence that was socially accepted at the time. Children in this field of work were often unfed and poorly clothed. In most cases, these children died from either falling through the chimneys or from lung damage and other horrible diseases from breathing in the soot. In the earlier poem, a young chimney sweeper recounts a dream by one of his fellows, in which an angel rescues the boys from coffins and takes them to a sunny meadow; in the later poem, an apparently adult speaker encounters a child chimney sweeper abandoned in the snow while his parents are at church or possibly even suffered death where church is referring to being with God.

The poem from Songs of Experience was set to music in 1965 by Benjamin Britten as part of his song cycle Songs and Proverbs of William Blake.

Poems 
"The Chimney Sweeper" (from Songs of Innocence)

"The Chimney Sweeper" (from Songs of Experience)

Analysis
In 'The Chimney Sweeper' of Innocence, Blake can be interpreted to criticise the view of the Church that through work and hardship, reward in the next life would be attained; this results in an acceptance of exploitation observed in the closing lines 'if all do their duty they need not fear harm.' Blake uses this poem to highlight the dangers of an innocent, naive view, demonstrating how this allows the societal abuse of child labor.

In Experience, 'The Chimney Sweeper' further explores this flawed perception of child labor in a corrupt society. The poem shows how the Church's teachings of suffering and hardship in this life in order to attain heaven are damaging, and 'make up a heaven' of the child's suffering, justifying it as holy. The original questioner of the child ('Where are thy father and mother'?) offers no help or solution to the child, demonstrating the impact these corrupt teachings have had on society as a whole.

Gallery 
Scholars agree that the "of Innocence"  poem "The Chimney Sweeper" is the 12th object in the order of the original printings of the Songs of Innocence and of Experience and the "of Experience" version of the poem was 37th in the publication order. The following, represents a comparison of several of the extant original copies of the poem, their print date, their order in that particular printing of the poems, and their holding institution:

Notes

References

External links

provided by the William Blake Archive
A Comparison of Blake's Original Illustrated Versions of the Songs of Experience Poem provided by the William Blake Archive

1789 poems
1794 poems
Songs of Innocence and of Experience
Fictional chimney sweepers